Sándor Hunyady (1890–1942) was a Hungarian novelist and dramatist.

Works

Novels 
Diadalmas katona (elbeszélések), 1930 
Géza és Dusán (regény), 1932
Téli sport (regény), 1934
Családi album (regény), 1934
Az ötpengős leány (elbeszélések), 1935
A vöröslámpás ház (elbeszélések), 1937
A tigriscsíkos kutya (eleszélések), 1938
Nemes fém (regény), 1938 
Jancsi és Juliska (regény), 1939
Kártyabotrány asszonyok között (regény), 1940
A fattyú (regény), 1942 
Havasi levegőn (elbeszélések), 1952
Olasz vendéglő (elbeszélések), 1956
A hajó királynője (regény), Téli Sport (kisregény), 1969 (Réz Pál utószavával)
Három kastély (cikkgyűjtemény), 1971
Aranyifjú: Elbeszélések (1986) 963-207-722-9  (szerk. Illés Endre)
Árnyék a napsütésben: Hunyady Sándor (1890-1942) elbeszélései, tárcái, karcolatai, valamint dokumentumok, visszaemlékezések (2000) 963-85829-7-9  (szerk. Urbán László Alexander Brody előszavával)
Családi album: önéletrajz, 1934 (2000) 963-9048-70-4
Aranyfüst: összegyűjtött novellák (2006)   (szerk. Réz Pál)

Plays 
Júliusi éjszaka (1929)
Feketeszárú cseresznye (1930)
Pusztai szél (1931)
Bakaruhában (1931)
Erdélyi kastély (1932)
Ritz, 1919 (1933)
Aranyifjú (1933)
A három sárkány (1935)
Lovagias ügy (1935)
Bors István (1938)
Havasi napsütés (1939)
Kártyázó asszonyok (1939)
Nyári zápor (1941)

References

External links 

 

20th-century Hungarian dramatists and playwrights
20th-century Hungarian novelists
1890s births
1942 deaths
Hungarian male dramatists and playwrights
Hungarian male novelists
20th-century Hungarian male writers